Christ Church College, Kanpur is a college established in 1866, affiliated with Kanpur University,
in Kanpur, Uttar Pradesh, India.
Earlier in 1840, SPG Mission School was established to educated Christian students. Later its name turned to present one. It is managed by Church of North India (C.N.I). Agra Diocese, managed by the Christ Church College Society, Kanpur.

History 
Christ Church College, Kanpur, the oldest college of the city (1866), carries a historic heritage of supreme educational service and standards. The College began as an S.P.G. Mission school in the 1840s to educate children and those who chose it. First called Mission School, then Christ Church School, it grew into a college affiliated first to the Calcutta University in 1866, then to the Allahabad University in 1892, later to the Agra University in 1927, and last, to the Kanpur University (now the C.S.J.M. University) in 1966.

Courses 
The undergraduate and graduate programs offered are:

Bachelor of Arts 
Master of Arts 
Bachelor of Commerce
Master of Commerce
Master of Science
Bachelor of Science

Affiliations
1866 – University of Calcutta
1898 – Allahabad University
1927 – Agra University
1966 – Kanpur University (CSJM)

University

Christ Church College has planned to establish itself as a University very soon.

References

External links
 Official Website
 Christ Church College, Kanpur at wikimapia

Anglican universities and colleges
Universities and colleges in Kanpur
Universities and colleges affiliated with the Church of North India
Christianity in Uttar Pradesh
Educational institutions established in 1866
1866 establishments in India